Rosa carolina, commonly known as the Carolina rose, pasture rose, or prairie rose, is a perennial shrub in the rose family native to eastern North America. It can be found in nearly all US states and Canadian provinces east of  the Great Plains. It is common throughout its range and can be found in a wide variety of open habitats, from thickets and open woods to roadsides and along railroads.

Description

Rosa carolina is a perennial shrub. The stems have straight, needle-like thorns, which distinguishes it from very similar species such as R. palustris and R. virginiana, which have curved thorns. The fragrant flowers emerge in early summer. Blooms are about 6 to 8 centimeters (2.5 to 3 inches) in diameter, with five light pink petals and a yellow center. Flowers are typically borne singly on the ends of the current year's growth. There is no repeat bloom. The stems of the rose are upright, grayish in color on new growth, and brown on larger, older branches. Foliage is smooth and dark green. The plants proliferate by root spread. New growth will eventually become small to large thickets, anywhere from 0.5 to 1 m (18 to 40 inches) in height.

Distribution and habitat
The Carolina rose is frequently found in a wide range of habitats, including dry soils, at the border of prairies, woodlands, and savannas, in thickets, in upland forested areas, and dunes. It also grows in wet soils along stream beds, swamps and low grassy areas.

Cultivation
The Carolina rose can be cultivated. It needs full sun to moderate shade, well-drained soil and regular watering to thrive. The rose hips are edible, although very tart in flavor. The plant is attractive to several species of bees and also provides nesting materials to them.

References

carolina
Flora of the Eastern United States
Flora of Canada
Plants described in 1753
Taxa named by Carl Linnaeus